Manuel A. García Méndez was born in Aguadilla, Puerto Rico. He was a recognized businessman, lawyer, and politician.

Family
He came from a numerous family, in which several siblings were recognized politicians in Puerto Rico.  Among them were Miguel A. García Méndez and Juan B. García Méndez.

Politics
As Senator, he was responsible for introducing Law Number 74 of 1929, which gave women the right to vote.

He wanted statehood for Puerto Rico.

References

Members of the Senate of Puerto Rico
People from Aguadilla, Puerto Rico
Puerto Rican businesspeople
Puerto Rican lawyers